"Zip-a-Dee-Doo-Dah" is a song composed by Allie Wrubel with lyrics by Ray Gilbert for the Disney 1946 live action and animated movie Song of the South, sung by James Baskett. For "Zip-a-Dee-Doo-Dah", the film won the Academy Award for Best Original Song and was the second Disney song to win this award, after "When You Wish upon a Star" from Pinocchio (1940). In 2004, it finished at number 47 in AFI's 100 Years...100 Songs, a survey of top tunes in American cinema.

Disney historian Jim Korkis said the word "Zip-a-Dee-Doo-Dah" was reportedly invented by Walt Disney, who was fond of nonsense words such as "Bibbidi-Bobbidi-Boo" from Cinderella (1950) and "Supercalifragilisticexpialidocious" from Mary Poppins (1964). Ken Emerson, author of the book Doo-dah!: Stephen Foster And The Rise Of American Popular Culture, believes that the song is influenced by the chorus of the pre-Civil War folk song "Zip Coon", a "Turkey in the Straw" variation: "O Zip a duden duden duden zip a duden day".

Due to the controversy over racial connotations associated with Song of the South, since 2020, the song has been removed from soundtracks in Downtown Disney and Disneyland Park, and in 2023 it was removed from the park's "Magic Happens" parade when it returned from a nearly three-year hiatus due to the COVID-19 pandemic.

Notable versions
The Walt Disney Company never released a single from the soundtrack.

Johnny Mercer & The Pied Pipers had a no. 8 hit with their rendition of the song in December 1946. The flip side of the record was "Everybody Has a Laughing Place", from the same movie and by the same composers.  As a result, Mercer had to correct listeners who mistakenly assumed that he wrote it.
The Modernaires with Paula Kelly - this reached the No. 11 spot in the Billboard charts in 1946.
Sammy Kaye & His Orchestra - this also reached the No. 11 spot in the Billboard charts in 1946.
 The King's Men did a cover of the song during the "Johnson's Wax 60th Anniversary" episode of Fibber McGee and Molly.
 The Dave Clark Five recorded a version, released in 1964 on the albums The Dave Clark Five Return! and A Session with the Dave Clark Five.
 Louis Armstrong included it on Disney Songs the Satchmo Way (1966).
 The Jackson 5 recorded their version on Diana Ross Presents The Jackson 5 (1969).
 Greg & Steve recorded their version on Playing Favorites (1991).

Bob B. Soxx & the Blue Jeans version

Bob B. Soxx & the Blue Jeans, a Phil Spector-produced American rhythm and blues trio from Los Angeles, recorded  "Zip-a-Dee Doo-Dah" using the Wrecking Crew in late 1962. According to the Beatles' George Harrison: "When Phil Spector was making 'Zip-A-Dee Doo-Dah', the engineer who's set up the track overloaded the microphone on the guitar player and it became very distorted. Phil Spector said, 'Leave it like that, it's great.' Some years later everyone started to try to copy that sound and so they invented the fuzz box." The song also marked the first time his Wall of Sound production formula was fully executed.

In 1963, Bob B. Soxx & the Blue Jeans took their version of the song to number 8 on the Billboard Hot 100 chart and number 7 on the Hot R&B Singles chart.  Their song also peaked at number 45 in the UK Singles Chart the same year. The song was included on the only album the group ever recorded, Zip-a-Dee-Doo-Dah, issued on the Philles Records label.

Track listings
 "Zip-a-Dee Doo-Dah" – 2:40
 "Flip and Nitty" – 2:20

Personnel
This version was sung by the following people:
Bobby Sheen – lead vocals
Darlene Love – background vocals
Fanita James – background vocals

In popular culture
For many years, the song was part of an opening theme medley for the Wonderful World of Disney television program and it has often been used in other TV and video productions by the studio, including being sung as an audition piece by a series of children in the Disney film Life with Mikey. It is one of many popular songs that features a bluebird ("Mr. Bluebird's on my shoulder"), epitomized by the "bluebird of happiness", as a symbol of cheer.

The song is also the Departure melody of platform 1 of Maihama Station in Urayasu, Chiba, Japan.

The song was performed by Muppet bunnies in a 1980 episode of The Muppet Show guest starring Alan Arkin. 

The song is sung by Tom Hanks in several scenes from Disney's Splash. 

The song is used in Splash Mountain, a log flume ride based on Song of the South at Disneyland in California, Tokyo Disneyland in Japan, and formerly at Magic Kingdom in Florida.

"Zip-a-Dee-Doo-Dah" is sung at some point in Paul McCartney's film, Give My Regards to Broad Street.

The Saturday Night Live "TV Funhouse" animated cartoon "Journey to the Disney Vault" features a brief parody of the song. This rendition replaces "My, oh my, what a wonderful day! Plenty of sunshine headin' my way!" with Uncle Remus instead singing the lyrics, "Negroes are inferior in every way. Whites are much cleaner, that's what I say."

The phrase is mentioned on the song Klap Ya Handz from the debut album of hip-hop group Das EFX, when Krayz Drayz utters the line, "So zippity doo, da day, whoops I gots stuck."

A variant of the song is sung by Kurt Russell in Overboard.

In the Disneyland episode of the ABC sitcom Modern Family, Manny mentions the song when he comments in reference to the lack of Internet reception on Splash Mountain: "Do you know how many bars I had? Zip-a-dee-doo-dah."

References

1946 songs
Songs with lyrics by Ray Gilbert
Songs with music by Allie Wrubel
Bob B. Soxx & the Blue Jeans songs
Disney songs
Song recordings produced by Phil Spector
Song recordings with Wall of Sound arrangements
Best Original Song Academy Award-winning songs
Philles Records singles
Walt Disney Records singles